Hegang (also known as Heli and Xingshan), is a prefecture-level city in Heilongjiang province of the People's Republic of China, situated in the southeastern section of the Lesser Khingan Range, facing Jiamusi across the Songhua River to the south and Russia's Jewish Autonomous Oblast across the Amur River to the north. Hegang is one of the principal coal-producing cities in China.

History

Early history

The region of Hegang was a desolate and uninhabited area until the late 1890s. In 1906, the area of Hegang City was under the administration of Tangyuan County under the Qing Dynasty. Since then, the government has been encouraging people to farm in the region. In 1914, a coalfield was discovered in Haoli, and Heilongjiang Government approved to set up Xinghua Mines which is jointly invested by merchants including Shen Songnian. The area was also renamed Xingshan after the Xinghua Coal Mine. The Hegang mines were founded in 1916 by a Chinese entrepreneur with Russian capital. Hegang has witnessed rapid economic growth thanks to its rich coal resources. In 1926 a railway was built between Hegang and Jiamusi, some 30 miles to the south on the Songhua River. A coal carrier fleet was privately financed in 1930 by General Zhang Xueliang. In August 1932, Hegang mines were occupied by the Japanese as the Japanese Empire advanced through Manchuria. The mines were further developed during the Japanese occupation of Manchuria. On August 11, 1945, Hegang was occupied by the Soviet Red Army, and was relegated to the Communist Force. Since several major coal mines in southern Manchuria were controlled by Kuomintang Forces, Hegang became one of the main coal-producing area of Communist Force in the Chinese Civil-War, playing an important role in guaranteeing the acquisition of weapons and other war materials. Hegang was renamed in 1949, and set up as a prefecture-level city in Heilongjiang.

People's Republic
After 1949 the city experienced further rapid growth. The mines were extended and modernized, and their annual output increased dramatically. Most of the coal is high-quality coking coal that is also used to make coal gas; apart from a small quantity consumed in Jiamusi, the bulk of it is shipped by rail to Anyang, Henan and to other industrial cities such as Anshan and Benxi in Liaoning. By the late 1950s the coal industry employed more than 80 percent of the working population. Although the mines continued to be developed and output increased, Hegang's industrial activity was beginning to diversify, especially after a large thermal-power-generating installation was constructed by the early 1970s.

By 2021 the city's mining industry was in decline.

Geography

Hegang is located in the northeast part of Heilongjiang province, spanning from latitude 47° 04′−48° 9′ N to longitude 129° 40′−132° 31' E. Bordering prefecture-level cities are:
Jiamusi (SE)
Yichun (W)
Lesser Khingan Mountains crosses the city. Amur river and Songhua river are the main rivers in Hegang.

Climate 
Hegang has a humid continental climate (Köppen Dwb/Dwa), with long, bitterly cold, but dry winters, and humid and warm summers. Close to 2/3 of the annual precipitation falls in the months of June thru August. Extreme temperatures have ranged from −38.5 to 37.7 °C.

Subdivisions
The prefecture-level city of Hegang is divided into 6 districts and 2 counties. The information presented here uses the metric system and data from the 2010 Census.

Economy
In 2010, Hegang's GDP grew 16.1% to RMB 25.1 billion, ranking tenth among 13 prefectures and prefecture-level cities in the province. Agriculture and animal husbandry are considered two pillars of the city's primary industry. Heavy industry dominates the city's industrial sector. Other major industries in the city include agricultural products processing, food and beverage, pharmaceuticals, dairy and related products, forestry industries, and the production and supply of electricity.

Mining accidents 
Two major mining accidents have occurred near the city. In September 2008, there was a fire at Fuhua Coal Mine, owned by Fuhua Mining Co., Ltd. It was caused by spontaneous combustion of coal. 31 miners died (19 deaths, 12 missing). In November 2009, there was a gas explosion at Xinxing coal mine, owned by Heilongjiang Longmay Mining Holding Group. Out of 528 workers, 420 miners were rescued and over 100 miners died. Of the 60 hospitalised survivors, they had broken bones, gas poisoning or respiratory injuries.

Transport
The Yichun-Hegang Highway, the Jiamusi-Hegang Highway and the Hegang-Luobei Highway form a comprehensive highway network within the city. It takes less than four hours to drive from Hegang to Harbin, the provincial capital of Heilongjiang Province. Luobei Port, which is within a one-hour drive from Hegang, is a major port on the Amur River. Jiamusi Airport, a one-hour drive from Hegang, operates flights to Beijing, Dalian and other major cities domestically.

Education
By the end of 2019, Hegang had one full-time higher education school with 2,926 students and 915 graduates. There are 7 specialized secondary schools, with 5,629 students and 1,464 graduates. There are 50 general secondary schools, with 37,982 students and 14,886 graduates. There are 36 primary schools with 29,771 students and 4,427 graduates. There is 1 special education school with 191 students. There are 144 kindergartens, with 12,045 children in attendance.

Sister cities
 Birobidzhan, Jewish Autonomous Oblast, Russia

Notable people 
 Qin Yuhai - Chinese politician and photographer. He was a former Mayor of Hegang (1997-1998).

References

External links

Official website
 With nothing to lose, loners build future in China's hollowed-out north (January 12, 2020)
 The Twilight of Chinese Coal (January 16, 2020)

 
Hegang
Prefecture-level divisions of Heilongjiang